Alcis admissaria is a moth of the family Geometridae described by Achille Guenée in 1858. It is found in Afghanistan, China, India, Taiwan and Tibet.

Subspecies
Alcis admissaria admissaria
Alcis admissaria undularia Wileman, 1911

References

Boarmiini
Moths described in 1858
Moths of Asia
Taxa named by Achille Guenée